Antoine Thiout the elder (Paris, 1692–1767) was a French clockmaker. He wrote Traité de l'horlogerie mechanique et pratique (Paris, 1741), a treatise on clockmaking which was widely read in his time. His plates describe clock and watch mechanisms which were often used in 18th century timepieces: for example a verge escapement powered by a spring encased in a barrel, and a regulation based on a cone-shaped fusee.

Works

Notes

French clockmakers
1692 births
1767 deaths